The Palestine Exchange (PEX) (bursat filasteen) is a stock exchange based in Nablus in the Palestinian territories. The PEX was established in 1995, and currently operates under the supervision of the Palestinian Capital Market Authority (CMA). In 2015, the CEO of the PEX was Ahmed Aweidah. The PEX aims to provide an environment for trading that is characterized by equity, transparency and competence, serving and maintaining the interest of investors.
 
As of December 2012, 48 companies were listed on the PEX, with a total market capitalization of about US$3 billion in five main areas: financial services, insurance, investments, industry, and services. Most of the listed companies trade in Jordanian dinars or in US dollars. The PEX is open Sunday to Thursday between 9.45 a.m. and 1 p.m. throughout the year. It is closed on Friday, Saturday, public holidays and the last working day of the fiscal year. There are about ten stockbroker firms which are authorised to place orders and process financial products on the PEX.

The PEX has been a private entity since its founding. As of 2013, only shares have been traded on the PEX; however, the PEX is open to including other securities. In 2009, the PEX was ranked thirty-third amongst the worldwide security markets, and regionally was second in terms of investor protection. About half of the PEX's investment comes from Palestinian companies, with the other half being from other countries. The PEX is a member of the Federation of Euro-Asian Stock Exchanges (FEAS).

History
The Palestine Exchange (PEX) was incorporated as a private shareholding company in early 1995, with the Palestine Development & Investment Company (PADICO) as its major shareholder. The Palestinian Authority (PA) approved the PADICO-sponsored design and work plan in July 1995, and a project team was put together by the PEX to establish a fully electronic exchange and depository. EFA Software Services, a Canadian company, provided both the trading and settlement and clearing systems. By August 1996, the PEX was fully operational, and on 7 November 1996 the PEX signed an operating agreement with the PA, allowing for the licensing and qualification of brokerage firms. On 18 February 1997, the PEX conducted its first trading session. The PEX launched an e-trading portal on 24 April 2007. The PEX was fully automated upon establishment, a first amongst Arab Stock Exchanges. The PEX became a public company in February 2010 and was itself listed on 4 April 2011.

Regulatory framework 
In 2005, with the development of the legal structure of the securities sector in Palestine, particularly the issuance of the Securities Law No. (12) of 2004 and the Capital Market Authority Law No. (13) of 2004, the Palestine Capital Market Authority (CMA) took over the supervision of the PEX and issuing securities by public companies.

The PEX operates in accordance with the Securities Law No. (12) of 2004, and the bylaws that stemmed from it in a manner that does not contravene with the CMA directives.

See also
List of Mideast stock exchanges
List of stock exchanges
List of stock market indices
Stock exchange

References

External links
Palestine Exchange (PEX)
PEX 2011 Annual Report

Stock exchanges in the Middle East
Economy of the State of Palestine

id:Daftar bursa saham